Summit Credit Union, founded in 1935, is a credit union that was once based in Madison, Wisconsin, United States. In 2019 they moved their headquarters to nearby Cottage Grove, Wisconsin. , it has 49 locations throughout the state. Summit has more than 227,000 members and $4.9 billion in assets, making it one of the largest credit unions in the state. Summit Credit Union is regulated by the National Credit Union Administration (NCUA) as a federally insured state-chartered credit union. It was officially chartered in 1935 and was assigned NCUA charter number 67190.

History
Kim Sponem, CEO & President of Summit Credit Union, has been a credit union CEO for more than 20 years, including the top job when Summit was named Great Wisconsin Credit Union and, originally, CUNA Credit Union.

CUNA, Inc. founded CUNA Credit Union, known today as Summit Credit Union, on September 17, 1935 in Madison, Wisconsin to serve the credit union movement and anyone else who was in need of credit union services. This unique charter was granted by the Wisconsin bank commissioner in 1935.

The first location was in its sponsor company, in the Filene House. Credit union movement pioneers and organizers Thomas Doig and Roy Bergengren were early advocates for the formation of CUNA Credit Union to ensure all people everywhere had access to credit union membership. Back then, employees of a credit union could not borrow from their credit union. The credit union was there to ensure that employees could still receive their product needs from a credit union and that state leagues across the country had access to a credit union for their banking needs.

Shortly after establishing this credit union, CUNA Mutual was formed to provide insurances and other services to credit unions and became one of its sponsor groups in addition to CUNA, Inc. The credit union expanded to other credit union entities as they were created, including World Council of Credit Unions (WOCCU), Credit Union Executive Society (CUES) and Filene and expanded to serve anyone, anywhere.

In 2005, CUNA Credit Union changed its name to Great Wisconsin Credit Union (GWCU) and then, in 2008, changed its name to Summit Credit Union, merging in the former Summit Credit Union, formerly State Capitol Employees Credit Union, maintaining CUNA/Great Wisconsin’s original charter and field of membership.

References

Credit unions based in Wisconsin
Companies based in Madison, Wisconsin
Banks established in 1935
Economy of Madison, Wisconsin